Ugamia is a genus of flowering plants in the chamomile tribe within the sunflower family.

There is only one known species, Ugamia angrenica, native to Kazakhstan, Uzbekistan, and Kyrgyzstan.

References

Monotypic Asteraceae genera
Flora of Central Asia
Anthemideae